Unitil Corporation is an interstate electricity and natural gas utility company that provides services for New Hampshire, Massachusetts and Maine. Its earliest predecessor company, the Portland Gas Light Company, was founded in Maine in 1849. The current company was set up in 1984 and is based in New Hampshire. With a market cap of 686.51M, it provides electric services to about 102,400 customers and natural gas to over 75,900 customers. The service territory of Unitil includes business districts and recreational centers as well as commercial and industrial business, such as electronic component manufacturers and education institutes. The company has an enterprise value of $766.54 million. The non-utility business is operated through the company's subsidiary, U-source, which is a national energy brokering and consulting company.

Background

History of Unitil

1849	Portland Gas Light Company founded in Maine.

1852	Fitchburg Gas and Electric Light Company is organized to illuminate gas streetlights in downtown Fitchburg, Massachusetts.

1901	Concord Electric Company is founded.

1908	Exeter & Hampton Electric Company is founded.

1979	Northern Utilities is incorporated. Its predecessor companies include Portland Gas Light Company.

1984	
Unitil Corporation is incorporated as a public utility holding company, with utility operating subsidiaries Concord Electric Company and Exeter & Hampton Electric Company. Unitil Service Corp. is founded to provide joint administrative services for Unitil's subsidiary companies.

1992	Unitil merges with Fitchburg Gas and Electric Light Company, and Fitchburg remains as one of Unitil's operating utility companies.

1993	Unitil founds Unitil Resources, Inc. as a non-utility subsidiary. Its affiliate, Usource LLC., provides energy brokerage services to large energy users throughout the northeast seeking competitive electricity or natural gas supply.

2002	Concord Electric Company and Exeter & Hampton Electric Company merge, and Unitil Energy Systems is the new name of the combined companies.

2008	Northern Utilities and Granite State Gas Transmission are acquired by Unitil.

2018	Tom Meissner was named Unitil's Chairman of the Board, Chief Executive Officer, and President.

The company generates revenue mainly distributing utility to customers through operating the underground transmission pipeline and providing energy consulting services and real estate services. In 2013, the revenue of the gas operation is $170.4 million, accounting for 46% of the total operation revenue, and the electricity operation revenue, $190.7 million, represents 52% of the total revenue.

The company has four segments, three wholly owned distribution utilities and five subsidiaries, providing utilities and relevant advice and management service to customers. The three distribution utilities are Unitil Energy Systems, Inc., Fitchburg Gas and Electric Light Company and Northern Utilities, Inc.

The cold weather made more and more people switch to the service of Unitil, which resulted in a gas sale increase, so the company has planned to invest $570 million to expand its distribution infrastructure to serve a larger number of customers.

In winter 2014, the company has asked for a price increase to part of its customers in Greater Portland and the Lewiston-Auburn because of the high demand and harsh weather. The Maine Public Utilities Commission (PUC) approved its price increase but cut its request by one-third.

References

External links
 

Energy in New Hampshire
Electric power companies of the United States
Natural gas companies of the United States
Companies based in New Hampshire
American companies established in 1984
Energy companies established in 1984
Non-renewable resource companies established in 1984
1984 establishments in New Hampshire
Companies listed on the New York Stock Exchange
Hampton, New Hampshire